Ribagorçan (autonym:  or ) is a number of Romance dialects spoken in the modern territories of the medieval County of Ribagorza, in northern Spain.

The area corresponds to the modern administrative units of Ribagorza/Ribagorça and La Litera/La Llitera, in the province of Huesca, Aragon, and Alta Ribagorça in the province of Lleida, Catalonia. Today, depending on provincial and regional perspectives, Ribagorçan may be described in Aragon as transitional to Catalan, or in Catalonia as transitional to Aragonese.  Eastern dialects in the area tend to be classified as Catalan, and western dialects as Aragonese, with a small central area of more difficult classification.

Historically, the county and its dialect was influenced by its political alliances, conquerors and rulers—ranging from the Romans to the Goths, Navarrese, the Franks, Moors, Castilians and Catalans.  As such, the spoken language evolved from a variant of Vulgar Latin and was influenced along the way by its geo-linguistic neighbors—Basque, Gascon (Occitan), Castilian, French, Aragonese and Catalan.

Written language
Being predominantly a spoken language, written documents are scarce, but they do exist—most notably, the Pastoradas of Benabarre compiled by Ricardo del Arco as well the writings of Tonón de Baldomera and poetry of Cleto Torrodellas; and more recently works by Ana Tena Puy, Carmen Castán and Bienvenido Mascaray Sin.

With the recognition of Aragonese as a language in 2003, intra-regional identities, among them Ribagorçan, have gained strength, and there is renewed interest in preserving, teaching and developing the local dialects commonly referred to as fabla.

Linguistic characteristics
In Aragon, the dialect in Ribagorza can be clustered into two main groups: Upper and Lower Ribagorçan defined by an isogloss line running east–west from the Turbón mountain. However locals prefer to demarcate three subdialects:

In Catalonia the Ribagorçan dialect spoken in the county of Alta Ribagorça, is also clustered. A dialectal variant exemplified by the Ribagorçan speakers of Pont de Suert, is Catalan dominant transitional to Aragonese with some traits of Aranese Gascon.

Phonology
Some features include:
Moving westward preserved final  is more frequent.
 Occasional diphthongization of Romance short vowels, as in Aragonese:  → ;  → , becoming more generalized moving westward; e.g., Latin  →  ; Latin  →  
 Occasional interdental fricative as reflex of Latin  before front vowels; e.g.,   ('five'). This feature gets more general moving westward (cf. Eastern Ribagorçan and Catalan  ).
 Different results for second-person plural endings of verbs (Latin -), from west to east: -z  (as in some western variants of Aragonese), -tz  (as in Occitan) or -u  (as in modern Catalan).
 Different results from the Romance voiced prepalatal affricate ( from i-, dj- and gj-), from west to east:  (as in some occidental variants of Aragonese and  Valencian),  (as in medieval Catalan and most of contemporary Valencian and Occitan),  (as in most of contemporary Catalan). E.g.,   (Western Ribagorza),   (Eastern Ribagorçan) ('young ones').
 Loss of final  of infinitives and polysyllabic words, a feature shared with most of contemporary Catalan (except Valencian variants). E.g., Latin  →   ('woman'), Vulgar Latin  →   ('to work')

Morphology and syntax
 Preterite formed with auxiliary forms derived from Latin  + infinitive, e.g.,   ('he/she did'), a feature shared with Catalan that is characteristic of Western Aragonese dialects westward from Gistaín valley.

Notes

References

Bibliography 
 Arnal Purroy, María Luisa & Naval López, Maria Ángeles. Lengua y literatura de unos poemas en ribagorzano (1861–1888). Archivo de Filología Aragonesa XLII-XLIII. 1989.

External links 
Diccionari  
Ribagorzano  en la Gran Enciclopedia Aragonesa online
 Óscar Latas Alegre.  Os bocables recullitos por Jean J. Saroïhandy en Zanui , Revista ROLDE 114, (December 2005),  pp. 44–49.

Aragonese dialects
Catalan dialects

an:Aragonés ribagorzano
ca:Català ribagorçà